"Alone" is a song by American rapper and singer Rod Wave, released on August 8, 2022 as the fourth single from his fourth studio album Beautiful Mind (2022). It was produced by Will-A-Fool and B Squared.

Composition
The song revolves around the relationship between love and loss. Lyrically, Rod Wave sing-raps about his feelings of loneliness due to abandonment from a lover, over a guitar melody. He interpolates "U.N.I." by Ed Sheeran in the middle of his verse.

Music video
The music video was released alongside the single, and centers on a couple that is in a strained relationship because the man is more interested in "running the streets" with his friends. After the woman dies in an accident, the man realizes how important she was to him and regrets not understanding it before.

Charts

References

2022 singles
2022 songs
Rod Wave songs
Songs written by Rod Wave
Songs written by Ed Sheeran
Songs written by Jake Gosling